Singaaravva is 2003 Indian Kannada language film directed by T. S. Nagabharana, based on the novel Singaravva Mattu Aramane by  Chandrashekhara Kambara, and starring Prema and Avinash.

At the 50th National Film Awards, the film was awarded the Best Feature Film in Kannada.

Cast 
Prema as Singari

Reception  
Leslie Felperin of Variety wrote that " Less song-led than Bollywood pics, this regional production focuses more on story. Perfs are broad, typical of Indian cinema, with lively lensing from B.C. Gowrishankar".

Awards
 National Film Awards-2002

National Film Award for Best Feature Film in Kannada

 Karnataka State Film Awards 2002-03
Best Art Director – Shashidhar Adapa

References

External links 
 An Interview with Nagabharana

2003 films
Films based on Indian novels
Films scored by C. Ashwath
2000s Kannada-language films
Kannada literature
Best Kannada Feature Film National Film Award winners
Films directed by T. S. Nagabharana